Hippopotamus madagascariensis, the Madagascar or Madagascan dwarf hippopotamus, is an extinct species of hippopotamus, endemic to the island of Madagascar. Known only from bones, it is believed to have gone extinct sometime after 1500. It was one of three hippopotamus species, the Malagasy hippopotamuses, which were native to Madagascar and are all extinct.

Taxonomy
Malagasy hippopotamuses were first discovered in the mid-19th century by Alfred Grandidier, who unearthed nearly 50 individual hippos from a dried-up swamp at Ambolisaka near Lake Ihotry, a few miles from the Mozambique Channel. In 1989, Scandinavian palaeontologist Solweig Stuenes described H. madagascariensis and H. lemerlei from these bones.

Description
Like the modern pygmy hippopotamus (Choeropsis liberiensis), the Malagasy pygmy hippo had eyes on the side of its head rather than high orbits and teeth of the common hippopotamus. The Malagasy pygmy hippo was similarly less aquatic, with many of its fossils found in the forested highlands of Madagascar. These similarities may be due to convergent evolution.

Fossils of both the Malagasy pygmy hippopotamus and H. lemerlei show a cursorial adaptation, distinct from the hippos on the African continent, and they would have been much better runners.

Extinction
Although there have been no remains dating to within the last thousand years, the hippopotamus has been surprisingly common in Malagasy oral legends. The strength of these oral traditions led the International Union for Conservation of Nature (IUCN) to classify H. madagascarensis as recently extinct (going extinct some time after the year 1500).

At least seven hippopotamus bones show unequivocal signs of butchery, suggesting that they survived until humans arrived on Madagascar. Humans and hippos may have coexisted for about 2,000 years. It is possible overhunting by humans led to their extinction.

See also
Hippopotamus lemerlei
Hippopotamus laloumena

References

Extinct hippopotamuses
Extinct animals of Madagascar
Holocene extinctions
Mammals described in 1989
Mammal extinctions since 1500